The Car Engineer of the Century was an international award given to the most influential car engineer of the twentieth century.  The election process was overseen by the Global Automotive Elections Foundation.

The winner, Ferdinand Porsche, was announced at an awards gala on December 18, 1999 in Las Vegas.

The selection process
The process for deciding the Car Engineer of the Century started with the list of candidates below.

The next step was for a jury of 132 professional automotive journalists, from 33 countries, under the presidency of Lord Montagu of Beaulieu, to reduce the list to 5, which they did, and the result was announced in November 1999.  Finally the 5 were ranked by the jury and the overall winner was selected.

See also
 Automotive engineer
 List of motor vehicle awards
 Car of the Century
 Car Designer of the Century
 Car Entrepreneur of the Century
 Car Executive of the Century

References
 

Motor vehicle awards

Awards established in 1999
Ferdinand Porsche
1999 establishments in Nevada